Porcelain House, also known as China house, is a contemporary  museum of pottery and antiques in Tianjin, China. 

The museum is located in a historical colonial building, which has been radically re-decorated by its present owner, Zhang Lianzhi, using copious amounts of broken porcelain. The house also contains antique furniture. The site is a tourist attraction.

See also
Trencadís
Park Güell

References

External links

WhatsOnTianjin.com
CNTV.com

Museums in Tianjin
Tourist attractions in Tianjin
Visionary environments
Ceramics museums in China